The 1989 Iowa Hawkeyes football team represented the University of Iowa in the 1989 NCAA Division I-A football season. The Hawkeyes played their home games at Kinnick Stadium and were led by head coach Hayden Fry. Iowa finished with a 5–6 record (3–5 Big Ten) and failed to make a bowl for the first time since the 1980 season.

Schedule

Roster

Game summaries

Oregon

at Iowa State

The Hawkeyes defeated the Cyclones for the seventh consecutive time.

Tulsa

Michigan State

at Wisconsin

Nick Bell ran for a career high 217 yards and scored 3 touchdowns (2 rushing, 1 receiving) in the Hawkeyes' win over Wisconsin.

Michigan

at Northwestern

Illinois

at Ohio State

at Purdue

Minnesota

Worst conference loss since 1980 vs. Purdue

Awards and honors

Team players in the 1990 NFL Draft

References

Iowa
Iowa Hawkeyes football seasons
Iowa Hawkeyes football